Karen Hensel is an American actress. She is perhaps best known for the recurring role of Doris Collins, the mother of Sharon Newman, on the American soap opera The Young and the Restless.  She played Doris from 1994 to 2005, and returned to the show in 2009 to resume the role.

Hensel has guest-starred in:
 Star Trek: The Next Generation
 Star Trek: Deep Space Nine
 Murder, She Wrote
 Knots Landing
 Strong Medicine
 The Practice
 Judging Amy
 Frasier
 Mama's Family
 The Magnificent Seven television series

She also appeared in the films Chained Heat, Faith and Psycho III.

External links

American soap opera actresses
American television actresses
Living people
Year of birth missing (living people)
21st-century American women